Gasparillo may refer to:

 Gasparillo, Island of Trinidad, Trinidad and Tobago; a town
 Gasparillo Island, Trinidad and Tobago; an island
 Gasparillo station, a train station on the Trinidad Government Railway
 Gasparillo, another name for the flowering plant Esenbeckia (plant)

See also

 Gasparillo / Bonne Aventure, a Trinidadian electoral district in Couva–Tabaquite–Talparo
 
 Gasparilla (disambiguation)
 Gaspar (disambiguation)

Disambiguation pages